Charles Edward "Ed" Connor Jr. (born 13 August 1955) is an American neuroscientist who has made important contributions to the neuroscience of object synthesis in higher-level visual cortex.
From 2009 he has been  a Professor of Neuroscience at  Johns Hopkins University. In 2007 Connor was appointed Director of the Zanvyl Krieger Mind Brain Institute at Johns Hopkins. Connor has interests in neuroaesthetics, the relation between neuroscience and beauty.

Education

Connor completed a B.S. in Biology at Loyola University Maryland in 1978, an M.S. at Vanderbilt University School of Medicine in 1982 and a PhD at Johns Hopkins University in 1990 under Ken Johnson.

Connor pursued neuroscience as a postdoctoral researcher with Gian Poggio and Mike Steinmetz at Johns Hopkins University School of Medicine (1990–1992) and with David van Essen at California Institute of Technology and Washington University School of Medicine (1992–1996) before joining the faculty at the Johns Hopkins School of Medicine in 1996.

Personal life
Since 2002, Connor has been married to Amy Bastian, who is a Professor of Neuroscience at Johns Hopkins School of Medicine, and they have one son.

Quotes
"Vision is your superpower!!"

References

External links
 Neurotree
 Neural changes underlying visual shape learning video
 Hopkins study finds brain cells that orient us in relation to gravity

1955 births
Living people
American neuroscientists
Washington University in St. Louis alumni
Johns Hopkins University faculty